Panskura Purba Assembly constituency is an assembly constituency in Purba Medinipur district in the Indian state of West Bengal.

Overview
As per orders of the Delimitation Commission, No. 204 Panskura Purba Assembly constituency is composed of the following: Kolaghat CD Block.

Panskura Purba Assembly constituency is part of No. 30 Tamluk (Lok Sabha constituency).

Members of Legislative Assembly

Election results

2016 election

.# Swing calculated on LF+Congress vote percentages taken together in 2016.

2011

 
  

 

.# Swing calculated on Congress+Trinamool Congress vote percentages taken together in 2011.

2006

 
  

.# Swing calculated on Trinamool Congress+BJP vote percentages taken together in 2006.

2001

 
  

.# Swing calculated on Trinamool Congress+Congress vote percentages taken together in 2001.

1996

1977-2006
In the 2006 state assembly elections Amiya Kumar Sahoo of CPI(M) won the Panskura East assembly seat defeating his nearest rival Biplab Ray Chowdhury of Trinamool Congress. Contests in most years were multi cornered but only winners and runners are being mentioned. Biplab Roychowdhury representing Trinamool Congress in 2001 and representing Congress in 1996, defeated Sisir Sarkar of CPI(M). Sisir Sarkar of CPI(M) defeated Biplab Roy Choudhury of Congress in 1991. Sibram Basu of CPI(M)  defeated Rabindra Bag of Congress in 1987. Swades Ranjan Maji, Independent/ Janata Party, defeated Biplab Roy Choudhury representing ICS  in 1982, and Adhir Kumar Chatterjee of Forward Bloc in 1977.

1951-1972
Geeta Mukherjee of CPI won the Panskura East seat in 1972, 1971, 1969 and 1967 defeating Amar Prasad Chakravarty of Forward Bloc, Birbhadra Gouri of Bangla Congress, Shyamdas Bhattacharya of Congress and Saradindu Samanta of Congress. Rajani Kanta Pramanik of Congress won in 1962 and 1957. In independent first election in 1951, the two Panskura seats were named Panskura North and Panskura South. While Rajanikanta Pramanik of Congress won the Panskura North seat, Shyama Bhattacharya of Congress won the Panskura South seat.

References

Assembly constituencies of West Bengal
Politics of Purba Medinipur district